Towrang is a closed railway station on the Main South railway line in New South Wales, Australia. A platform opened in the locality in 1869 south of the later station, called Mannafields after a property of the same name. A later station opened in 1874 north of the initial platform at 208 km south of Central, serving the small Southern highlands town of Towrang. It was an active station with a siding to load local agricultural produce. The station closed in 1974 and was demolished in the 1980s. Little evidence remains of the station, although two sets of points were later installed at the site to allow access to either track at times of track maintenance.

References

Railway stations in Australia opened in 1869
Railway stations closed in 1974
Disused regional railway stations in New South Wales
1974 disestablishments in Australia
Main Southern railway line, New South Wales